AEHS may refer to:
Amanda Elzy High School
Ankara Elementary/High School